(May there be praise and glory and honour), 28/2a and 231, identical to the second movement of BWV Anh. 160, is a motet composed by Johann Sebastian Bach. It was composed some time in 1725.

Text
BWV 28/2a is an arrangement of the second movement of Bach's cantata Gottlob! nun geht das Jahr zu Ende, BWV 28, with a different text, however taken from the same Lutheran hymn, that is Johann Gramann's "Nun lob, mein Seel, den Herren" (1530).

Music
The motet has SATB voice parts. In some printings of this motet, a basso continuo is added to support the bass part, doubling it exactly.

Recordings

 Thomanerchor Leipzig, Baroque Brass of London and Capella Thomana conducted by Georg Christoph Biller (recorded February 1997).

References

External links
 
 

Motets by Johann Sebastian Bach